The GT46C-ACe is a model of Australian diesel electric locomotive designed and built by Downer Rail at its Cardiff Locomotive Workshops using Electro-Motive Diesel components from 2007.

The first units were built as the SCT class for freight operator SCT Logistics from 2007 followed by the LDP class and TT class for Pacific National, the GWA class and GWB class for Genesee and Wyoming Australia (later One Rail Australia which was sold to Aurizon in July 2022) the WH class for Whitehaven Coal, and the SSR class for Southern Shorthaul Railroad.

Design

The class was a new design for Australian conditions based on other locomotives produced by Downer EDI Rail, such as the narrow gauge GT42CU AC purchased by Queensland Rail and Pacific National and the GT46C purchased by Westrail, Freight Australia and FreightLink. The GT42CU AC used a 12-cylinder EMD 710 engine, based on the USA built SD70MAC with scaled down traction motors, while the GT46C used a 16-cylinder EMD 710 engine with DC traction systems. The American SD70ACe was EMD's 2nd generation AC loco with IGBT inverters, but was too large and heavy for the Australian interstate standard gauge network, weighing in at 188 tonnes when the limit was 134 tonnes. In addition, the GT46C design was already at the 134 tonne limit, even before adding inverters, heavier traction motors and more cooling capacity for higher power engine, and there was a requirement that fuel capacity could not be sacrificed.

The locomotive has AC traction equipment, with a Mitsubishi Electric package also used on the SD70ACe, including a TA17 traction alternator, CA9E companion alternator and six ITB 2630 traction motors, along with solid state IGBT inverters. The prime mover is a turbocharged 16-cylinder EMD 710. New technology used included passive steer bogies, to reduce flange wear on curves. Until local production ceased in 2014, the class were built at Cardiff, with the frames constructed at Port Augusta, and the bogie frames at Kelso. Examples built post 2014 were built in the United States.

Variations by Class

SCT class
The SCT class are used by SCT Logistics on their freight services from Adelaide to Melbourne, Parkes and Perth. Locomotive SCT007 is named Geoff (James Bond) Smith after the CEO of the company. The benefits of AC traction has enabled a fleet of 15 locomotive to do the work of 20 DC traction equipped locomotives, three AC vs four DC units being needed on the Melbourne to Adelaide journey, and two AC vs three DC units between Adelaide to Perth. An on-train refuelling system carries 50,000 litres of diesel in a tanker behind the locomotives and eliminates the need to refuel en route. SCT's 001, 002, 006 & 013 have been overhauled and repainted during 2019.

TT class & LDP class

With the aging of the 48 and PL-class fleets, Pacific National purchased 31 TT classes for the trains of the Hunter Valley. TT02 was later named "Darrell Sherry". They are equipped with ECP brakes and are used with NHDH, NHEH and NHYH hoppers. They are different in some respects from SCT / LDP category units because they can run at two different weights: their weight, fuel load and operating range when the weight is between 139 and 132 tons Heavyweight same 90 classes; but under 132 tons, they are cleared for normal operation, such as SCT / LDP class.

The first locomotives were originally intended to built as LDP010-LDP018, and leased to other railway operators, until Downer EDI and Pacific National reached an agreement to sell directly. TT01 conducted the first test on 26 November 2009. TT130, TT131 and TT132 are owned by Pacific National.

The 9 locomotives LDP001-LDP009 were built by Downer as part of their in house 'Locomotive Demand Power' company that would lease locomotives to other freight operators. In 2018, Pacific National acquired these locomotives and used them for interstate intermodal freight services.

WH class
The three WH class locomotives were ordered by Whitehaven Coal entering service painted blue and white. They are used to haul coal trains from Whitehaven's mines in the Gunnedah Basin and are operated by Pacific National.

GWA & GWB class
In early 2011, One Rail Australia (ORA) ordered seven locomotives (later increased to 10) for the Adelaide–Darwin railway. The locomotives are used on several grain services throughout South Australia and One Rail's intermodal services between Adelaide and Darwin. 

The GWA class are accompanied by three, newly commissioned GWB class (GT46C ACe Gen-II) Locomotives (formerly known as EMD class). The GWB class have been recently obtained by One Rail Australia from storage in America. The locomotives are numbered GWB101-GWB103 and are utilised on intermodal, grain and ore traffic. These were included in the sale of ORA to Aurizon in July 2022. Aurizon has four more GWB's on order, for delivery in 2022. These were originally ordered by One Rail Australia, before the business was purchased. GWB104-106 arrived on Australian shores on the 24th January 2023.

SSR class 
The 2 class members were ordered by Southern Shorthaul Railroad in 2014 to operate its grain services, displacing hired motive power. SSR currently has two more units on order.

Qube Holdings 
In December 2022, it was announced that Qube Holdings had placed an order for 12 units, for delivery from Q3 2023. These units will be imported from the United States, following on from the GWB Class, built in 2019 and 2022. They will be used on Qube's new interstate intermodal rail services.

CBH Group 
In December 2022, it was announced that CBH Group had ordered seven locomotives from Progress Rail to bolster their standard gauge locomotive fleet. These locomotives will be delivered by November 2024.

Fleet

Related Development
 Downer EDI Rail GT46C, ancestor model
 Downer EDI Rail GT42CU AC, narrow gauge variant
 Downer EDI Rail GT42CU ACe, narrow gauge variant
 UGL Rail C44aci, principal competitor

References

External links

ARDP: SCT class detail photos

Co-Co locomotives
Pacific National diesel locomotives
Aurizon diesel locomotives
Railway locomotives introduced in 2007
Standard gauge locomotives of Australia
Diesel-electric locomotives of Australia